Peter Stroud (born April 23, 2002) is an American professional soccer player who plays as a midfielder for Major League Soccer club New York Red Bulls.

Career

Youth and college 
Stroud was born in Chester Township, New Jersey, attending Laurel Springs School. He played with the Player Development Academy at under-8's level, before moving to the New York Red Bulls academy under-12 team, where he played for three seasons. Aged sixteen, he made the move to England, joining West Ham United where he played for a further two years in their U18 and U23 sides.

Following his spell in England, Stroud returned to the United States, attending Duke University to play college soccer. In three seasons with the Blue Devils, Stroud made 56 appearances, scoring six goals and tallying twelve assists. He earned numerous awards during his time with the Blue Devils, been named All-ACC Third Team and ACC All-Freshman Team in his freshman season. ACC Midfielder of the Year, United Soccer Coaches All-American Third Team, All-ACC First Team, All-South Region First Team, and ACC All-Tournament Team in his sophomore season, and was a MAC Hermann Trophy Runner Up, United Soccer Coaches All-America First Team, ACC Midfielder of the Year, becoming the first player in ACC history to win back-to-back Midfielder of the Year awards, All-ACC First Team, and All-South Region First Team.

While at college, Stroud also played in the USL League Two with multiple teams. In 2021 he played for New York Red Bulls U23, where he made ten appearances. The following year he split time between FC Motown STA and Tobacco Road FC. He was later named the top USL League Two prospect and named to the 2022 All-League Team.

New York Red Bulls 
On January 14, 2023, Stroud left college early to sign a homegrown player contract with New York Red Bulls through to 2025. He made his professional debut on February 25, 2023, appearing as a 79th–minute substitute during a 1–0 loss to Orlando City.

Personal life 
Peter is the younger brother of Jared Stroud, who currently plays for St. Louis City. He also has two other older brothers, Will and Dylan, who both played at the college level.

References

External links 
 Peter Stroud New York Red Bulls profile
 Peter Stroud Duke Athletics profile

2002 births
Living people
All-American men's college soccer players
American expatriate soccer players
American expatriate sportspeople in England
American soccer players
Association football midfielders
Duke Blue Devils men's soccer players
Expatriate footballers in England
Homegrown Players (MLS)
Major League Soccer players
New York Red Bulls players
New York Red Bulls U-23 players
People from Chester Township, New Jersey
Soccer players from New Jersey
Sportspeople from Morris County, New Jersey
United States men's youth international soccer players
USL League Two players
West Ham United F.C. players